Lady Liu may refer to:

 Lady Liu, wife of Yuan Shao a warlord of Han Dynasty

Liu E (Han Zhao) (died 314), third empress consort of Liu Cong, emperor of Han Zhao
Empress Liu (Liu Yao's third wife) (died 326), third wife of Liu Yao, emperor of Han Zhao
Liu Fang ( 326), fourth wife of Liu Yao, emperor of Han Zhao, cousin to his third wife
Empress Liu (Shi Le's wife) (died 333), Shi Le's consort during the Later Zhao dynasty
Empress Liu (Shi Hu's wife) (318–349), Shi Hu's consort during the Later Zhao dynasty
Empress Liu (Huan Xuan's wife) ( 404), wife of warlord Huan Xuan (ruler of Chu)
Empress Liu (Chen dynasty) (534–616), empress of the Chen dynasty
Empress Dowager Liu (Sui dynasty) ( 605–618), empress dowager of the Sui dynasty
Empress Liu (Tang dynasty) (died 693), empress of the Tang dynasty
Consort Dowager Liu (died 925), Li Keyong's wife and consort dowager during the Later Tang dynasty
Empress Liu (Li Cunxu's wife) (died 926), Li Cunxu's consort during the Later Tang dynasty
Empress Liu (Li Congke's wife) (died 937), Li Congke's consort during the Later Tang dynasty
Empress Dowager Liu (Later Jin) (died 942), empress dowager of the Later Jin dynasty
Empress Liu (Li Maozhen's wife) (877–943), wife of warlord Li Maozhen (ruler of Qi)
Empress Liu (Zhenzong) (969–1033), Emperor Zhenzong of Song's consort and empress dowager during Emperor Renzong of Song's reign
Empress Liu (Zhezong) (1079–1113), Emperor Zhezong of Song's consort and empress dowager during Emperor Huizong of Song's reign
Liu Rushi (1618–1664), Ming dynasty courtesan and Qian Qianyi's wife